Amelia Mary Randall (née Davenport, 23 January 1844 – 17 October 1930) was a New Zealand companion help, church and community leader, landowner, businesswoman, and benefactor. She was born in Boulogne, France, in 1844.

References

1844 births
1930 deaths
New Zealand Baptists
French emigrants to New Zealand
New Zealand women in business
19th-century New Zealand businesspeople
19th-century New Zealand businesswomen